Karścino  (German Kerstin) is a village in the administrative district of Gmina Karlino, within Białogard County, West Pomeranian Voivodeship, in north-western Poland.

For the history of the region, see History of Pomerania.

The village has a population of 372 (2007).

The 90-megawatt Karścino Wind Farm is located nearby.

References 

Villages in Białogard County